The Grammy Award for Best Roots Gospel Album has been an award category at the annual Grammy Awards since 2015. 

The award was first approved by the board of trustees of the Grammy Awards in June 2014.

According to NARAS, the award was introduced to "provide a category for traditional Southern gospel and other "roots" gospel albums as both a protector of the heritage of this music and an acknowledgement of the growing interest and support of these genres." It is similar to the Grammy Award for Best Southern, Country or Bluegrass Gospel Album category which was active from 1991 to 2011.

The category is open for solo artists, duos, groups and other collaborations and is for albums only. In the Gospel genre field, it will sit with other categories such as Best Gospel Album and Best Contemporary Christian Music Album.

The Grammy is awarded to the performer(s) on the winning recording. If there is no identifiable artist (e.g. in soundtrack or various artist albums), the award is given to the (compilation) producer(s).

Recipients

Artists with multiple nominations

3 nominations
 Gaither Vocal Band
 The Isaacs
 Ernie Haase & Signature Sound

2 nominations
 The Martins
 Tim Menzies
 Joseph Habedank
 Gordon Mote
 Karen Peck and New River

See also
List of Grammy Award categories

References and links

 
2015 establishments in the United States
Album awards
Awards established in 2015
Grammy Award categories